The 9/11 Commission Report (officially the Final Report of the National Commission on Terrorist Attacks Upon the United States) is the official report into the events leading up to the September 11, 2001 terrorist attacks. It was prepared by the National Commission on Terrorist Attacks Upon the United States (also known as the “9/11 Commission” or the “Kean–Hamilton Commission”) at the request of US President George W. Bush and Congress and is available to the public for sale or free download.

The commission was established on November 27, 2002 (442 days after the attack) and issued its final report on July 22, 2004. The report was originally scheduled for release on May 27, 2004, however Speaker of the House Dennis Hastert approved a 60-day extension through July 26.

Findings

The commission interviewed over 1,200 people in 10 countries and reviewed over two and a half million pages of documents, including some closely guarded classified national security documents. The commission also relied heavily on the FBI's PENTTBOM investigation. Before it was released by the commission, the final public report was screened for any potentially classified information and edited as needed.

After releasing the report, commission chair Thomas Kean declared that both Presidents Bill Clinton and George W. Bush were "not well served" by the FBI and CIA.

In addition to identifying intelligence failures occurring before the attacks, the report provided evidence of the following:

 Airport security footage of the hijackers as they passed through airport security
 Excerpts from the United Airlines Flight 93 cockpit voice recording, which recorded the sounds of the hijackers in the cockpit and the passengers' attempts to regain control
 Eyewitness testimony of passengers as they described their own final moments to family members and authorities on airphones and cellphones from the cabins of doomed airliners

The commission also concluded 15 of the 19 hijackers who carried out the attacks were from Saudi Arabia, but the commission "found no evidence that the Saudi government as an institution or senior Saudi officials individually funded the organization" to conspire in the attacks, or that it funded the attackers even though the report identifies that "Saudi Arabia has long been considered the primary source of al-Qaeda funding". 
Mohamed Atta, the leader of the attacks, was from Egypt. Two hijackers were from the United Arab Emirates, and one was from Lebanon. According to the commission, all 19 hijackers were members of the al-Qaeda terrorist organization, led by Osama bin Laden. In addition, while meetings between al-Qaeda representatives and Iraqi government officials had taken place, the panel had no credible evidence that Saddam Hussein had assisted al-Qaeda in preparing or executing the 9/11 attacks.

The commission's final report also offered new evidence of increased contact between Iran and al-Qaeda. The report contains information about how "at least eight" of the 9/11 hijackers passed through Iran, and indicates that officials in Iran did not place entry stamps in their passports. However, according to the report (Chapter 7), there is no evidence that Iran was aware of the actual 9/11 plot.

The commission report chose to place blame for failure to notify the military squarely upon the Federal Aviation Administration (FAA). Ben Sliney, FAA operations manager at Herndon, Virginia, and Monte Belger, FAA Acting Deputy Administrator on 9/11, both stated to the commission that military liaisons were present and participating in Herndon's response as the events of 9/11 unfolded. Sliney stated that everyone who needed to be notified, including the military, was.

In addition to its findings, the report made extensive recommendations for changes that can be made to help prevent a similar attack. These include the creation of a National Intelligence Director over both the CIA and the FBI, and many changes in border security and immigration policy.

Public diplomacy and War on Terror

The 9/11 Commission Report states that "long-term success demands the use of all the elements of national power: diplomacy, intelligence, covert action, law enforcement, economic policy, foreign aid, public diplomacy, and homeland defense." Quantitative numbers will not defeat the terrorists and insurgents; however the objectives of defeating the enemy need to be specific enough so that the public can determine whether the goals are being met. In order to defeat an insurgency, one must promote a stronger ideology, value system, and security environment, than the opposition. The 9/11 Commission emphasizes the use of public diplomacy. Defeating insurgents and terrorists is not based on traditional war tactics; it encompasses a national strategic effort that employs all elements of national power.

In 2003, the U.S. government began to prioritize political and cultural support for the counterinsurgency efforts in Afghanistan. An Afghan regional official claimed that Afghanistan was on the right track for a stable government and begged the United States not to leave the theater, claiming that Afghanistan would lose progress if the U.S. withdrew their political support and local outreach to the public. 

According to the 9/11 Commission, conducting public diplomacy with the local population of Afghanistan is necessary for long-term success within the country. The report states, "A former Under Secretary of the State for Public Diplomacy and both chairmen of the 9/11 Commission expressed the view that public diplomacy tools are at least as important in the war on terrorism as military tools and should be given equal state and increased funding."

The 9/11 Commission states that currently the United States envisions an eventual Afghan government that is able to build a national army, coordinate infrastructure, and coordinate public services in major provinces throughout the country. The 9/11 Commission also suggests an increased effort in the U.S. State Department and the international community to become involved with "the rule of law and contain rampant crime and narcotics trafficking" in the area. However, in order to carry out these long-term goals the U.S. should rely on civilian-military teams to reach out to the population and listen to their concerns and implement them with the Afghan government effectively.

Currently there is a strong realization that negative public opinion about the U.S. could directly relate to how friendly countries in the Middle East will be in the war on terror, mainly in Afghanistan. Recently American involvement in the Middle East has not been accepted well; support for the United States has plummeted. The 9/11 Commission shows that favorable ratings for the United States has fallen from 61 to 15 percent in Indonesia and from 71 to 38 percent among Muslims in Nigeria. It also states that many disgruntled views about the U.S. develop from uninformed minds about America and that they are distorted by cartoon ideologies. Local newspapers in Middle Eastern countries that reinforce the Jihadist theme, portraying the U.S. as anti-Muslim, influence these fragile views. These ideas need to be effectively countered in order to win our counterinsurgency efforts in Afghanistan and our ideological war against Muslim extremism. More recently Congress and the Administration has sought ways to use these public diplomacy tactics to influence Arab populations to combat insurgents and terrorists.

Most Muslims are moderate and do not agree with violence; the commission claims that it is possible, through the use of public diplomacy, to drive a wedge between those moderate Muslims and the violent terrorists or insurgents. The U.S. also needs to stand for a better future and illustrate it to the local population in Afghanistan and to the Muslim community. The U.S. needs to take the moral leadership role in Afghanistan and throughout the world. For parents, insurgents in Afghanistan can only offer their children violence and death; the U.S. should utilize public diplomacy to counter the insurgent ideology.

American values and ideals are something that the Muslim population can connect to, agree with, and feel secure with. The 9/11 Commission advises that the U.S. stands up for its values and ideals to prevent the insurgents from distorting the ideology of liberty to persuade the Muslim world into the insurgent or terrorist ideology. Only through use of public diplomacy can the U.S. counter these political and ideological distortions. Explaining and making clear the U.S. stance on morality, freedom, and liberty to the local populations in the Middle East allows the U.S. to promote the American counterinsurgency effort in Afghanistan.

The 9/11 Commission elaborates on the example of humane treatment of prisoners of war. In order for the local populations of countries like Afghanistan, the U.S. and allies need to project a higher image of morality by the civil and humane treatment of terrorists that are captured. Accusations that the U.S. abuses its prisoners make it more difficult to win political, social, and diplomatic relations in our civilian-military operations in Afghanistan. Without careful prevention of derogatory use of information by the enemy, the United States will become a victim of the enemy's use of public diplomacy in war.

The 9/11 Commission believes that public diplomacy should be viewed as a dialogue with Arab populations, to enable a greater understanding between cultures and societies and to build those long-term relationships and trust that is needed to be successful at counterinsurgency warfare. "If we don't have long-term relationships with Muslim populations, we cannot have trust. Without trust, public diplomacy is ineffective."

Criticism

In a 2004 article titled, "Whitewash as Public Service: How The 9/11 Commission Report defrauds the nation", Harper's Magazine writer Benjamin DeMott stated that:

Other sources have criticized the commission for not digging deep enough to get to the core of the issues. In a 2004 interview with Bernard Gwertzman of the Council on Foreign Relations, Anthony H. Cordesman (the Arleigh A. Burke Chair in Strategy, the Center for International and Strategic Studies in Washington) stated of the report:

FAA counter-terrorism expert Bogdan Dzakovic believes that the security failures at airports that allowed the hijackers to board the planes were not due to the failures in the system that the report identified. Furthermore, he stated that "Many of the FAA bureaucrats that actively thwarted improvements in security prior to 9/11 have been promoted by FAA or the Transportation Security Administration." The report did not mention his name, despite Dzakovic giving the following testimony to the commission regarding his undercover checks on airport security prior to 9/11:

The report has been accused of not giving the whole story about the warnings the U.S. received prior to the attacks. While the report did describe that "the system was blinking red" and that an al Qaeda attack was imminent, it did not include the testimony of former CIA director George Tenet to the commission in January 2004, in which he claimed to have given a specific warning to the Administration in a July 2001 meeting with Condoleezza Rice. Commission members Thomas Kean and Lee Hamilton stated that they had not been told about the meeting. But the Boston Globe reported that "it turns out that the panel was, in fact, told about the meeting, according to the interview transcript and Democratic commission member Richard Ben-Veniste, who sat in on the interview with Tenet."

Literary praise
The report garnered praise in some quarters for its literary qualities. Richard Posner, writing for The New York Times, praised it as "uncommonly lucid, even riveting" and called it "an improbable literary triumph". The report rose to the top of several bestseller lists, and became one of the best-selling government reports of all time. The National Book Foundation named the report a finalist in its 2004 National Book Awards' non-fiction category.

Adaptations

In 2006, The 9/11 Commission Report, a straight to DVD movie, was released by The Asylum. It is based on the findings of the original 9/11 Commission Reports, although it does fictionalize some elements.

The report inspired a controversial television miniseries, The Path to 9/11. Dramatizing many specific scenes in the report, it is a synthesis of multiple (and in some cases partisan) sources in addition to the report itself.

The 9/11 Report: A Graphic Adaptation, by Sid Jacobson and Ernie Colón, and published by Hill & Wang, is an abridged graphic novel adaptation of the report.

On Native Soil is a documentary of the 9/11 Commission Report narrated by Kevin Costner & Hilary Swank.

In 2006, director Paul Greengrass adapted portions of the 9/11 Commission Report chronicling the events of United Airlines Flight 93 into the two-time Academy Award-nominated film United 93.

Select testimonies of the report were adapted as a flash-forward storytelling device in Hulu's 2018 mini-series The Looming Tower.

See also

 9/11 Public Discourse Project
 US Congressional Inquiry
 9/11: Press for Truth
 Pacific Air Lines Flight 773 – 1964 cockpit attack (resulted in 44 deaths)
 Federal Express Flight 705 – 1994 cockpit attack
 Southwest Airlines Flight 1763 – August 2000 cockpit attack
 Debt of Honor – 1994 Tom Clancy novel where a 747 is crashed into the U.S. Capitol
 Executive Decision – 1996 Kurt Russell movie where a 747 is used as a weapon targeting Washington, D.C.
 Operation Bojinka – plot by Ramzi Yousef and Khalid Shaikh Mohammed, foiled in 1995, to attack multiple airliners and crash a plane into the CIA

References

External links

 The 9/11 Commission Report at 9-11commission.gov (7.2 MB PDF)
 
 XHTML version of the full 9/11 Commission Report (hand-converted XHTML format)
 Video of 9/11 events (split screen) supplemented with text from Commission Report findings
 Slate's The 9/11 Report: A Graphic Adaptation by Sid Jacobson and Ernie Colón
 The Shea Memorandum to the 9/11 Commission
 CRS Report: U.S. Public Diplomacy: Background and the 9/11 Commission Recommendations
 Kindle-formatted version of the Complete 9/11 Commission Report

News articles
 9/11 panel report: 'We must act' – from CNN
 Bush vows to heed 9/11 report advice – from MSNBC
 9/11 Report: Key Findings from the BBC

Report
Counterterrorism in the United States
Non-fiction books adapted into films
Publications of the United States government
21st-century documents
2004 non-fiction books
George W. Bush administration controversies